Brazda is a village in the municipality of Čučer-Sandevo, North Macedonia.

Demographics
As of the 2021 census, Brazda had 647 residents with the following ethnic composition:
Macedonians 602
Persons for whom data are taken from administrative sources 17
Serbs 13
Roma 9
Others 6

According to the 2002 census, the village had a total of 480 inhabitants. Ethnic groups in the village include:
Macedonians 470 
Serbs 5
Others 5

References

Villages in Čučer-Sandevo Municipality